William Robert Brewer (born April 15, 1968) is an American former professional baseball pitcher who played in Major League Baseball (MLB) from  to  for the Kansas City Royals, New York Yankees, Oakland Athletics, and Philadelphia Phillies.

References

External links

1968 births
Living people
Albuquerque Dukes players
American expatriate baseball players in Canada
Baseball players from Fort Worth, Texas
Columbus Clippers players
Dallas Baptist Patriots baseball players
Edmonton Trappers players
Jamestown Expos players
Harrisburg Senators players
Kansas City Royals players
Major League Baseball pitchers
New York Yankees players
Oakland Athletics players
Omaha Royals players
Philadelphia Phillies players
Rochester Red Wings players
Rockford Expos players
Scranton/Wilkes-Barre Red Barons players
Springfield Sultans players
Visalia Oaks players
West Palm Beach Expos players